Eric Maldoff is a Canadian lawyer and political advisor. He was a close advisor to former Prime Minister of Canada, Jean Chrétien, and a negotiator on behalf of the Government of Canada from 1995 to 2007, particularly regarding first nations land claims.

He obtained his common law and civil law degrees from McGill University, and was called to the Bar of Quebec in 1976. He is a partner at the Montreal law firm of Lapointe Rosenstein Marchand Melançon. He has also sat on the board of governors of McGill University since 2006.  He is president of the Old Brewery Mission.

In 1982, he was a founder and became the first president of Alliance Quebec, the pro-anglophone Quebec lobby group.

Honours
 2001 - Order of Canada 
 2002 - Golden Jubilee Medal 
 2013 - Diamond Jubilee Medal 
 2013 - Lawyer Emeritus

References

Living people
Lawyers from Montreal
Anglophone Quebec people
Members of the Order of Canada
McGill University Faculty of Law alumni
Year of birth missing (living people)